On March 18, 1964, Marise Ann Chiverella, a 9-year-old American girl, was raped and murdered while on her way to school by 22-year-old James Paul Forte in Hazleton, Pennsylvania.

The murder went unsolved for nearly 58 years, until it was announced by authorities in 2022 that the perpetrator had been identified as James Paul Forte using investigative genetic genealogy. It is believed to be the oldest cold case in Pennsylvania to be solved through this method. The murder's solving gained major media coverage, partially due to the fact that 20-year-old college student, Eric Schubert had a significant role in the identification of Forte.

Murder 
On the morning of March 18, 1964, 9-year-old Marise Ann Chiverella left home for school, carrying canned goods to give to her teacher, at St. Joseph's Parochial School in Hazleton, Pennsylvania. At some point while Chiverella was walking to school, she was kidnapped by James Paul Forte. Forte raped and then murdered Chiverella by strangulation.

In the afternoon of the same day, a man was giving his 16-year-old nephew driving lessons when they encountered what they initially thought was a "large doll" in a coal-mining pit, but soon realized it was Chiverella's body and called police.

Investigation 
Despite months of nonstop work, authorities were not able to retrieve any initial leads following the murder.

Decades later, in 2018, the authorities teamed up with Parabon NanoLabs, a DNA technology and genetic genealogy company. The following year, the company shared the DNA profile with genealogical databases.

The authorities began to work with genealogist and Elizabethtown College student, then 18-year-old Eric Schubert, in 2020. DNA from semen on Chiverella's clothing was uploaded to public genealogy databases, leading to a distant cousin of the perpetrator whom Schubert then identified.

2022 update and identification of perpetrator 
On February 12, 2022, authorities announced that with assistance from Schubert's research and Parabon NanoLabs' initial work, the perpetrator had been identified as 22-year-old James Paul Forte. He lived six or seven blocks from Chiverella, but did not have any known relation to her or her family. An exhumation of Forte's body was approved once he was identified as the prime suspect of the murder.

Perpetrator 
James Paul Forte was a bartender and bar supplies salesman from the Hazleton area. He was born in Hazleton and lived in the town his entire life. He was never married and never had any known children. Forte was arrested in 1974 in an unrelated case on charges of involuntary deviate sexual intercourse and sexual assault. Forte was given a plea deal for the less serious conviction of aggravated assault and was sentenced to one year probation. He was arrested again in 1978 on charges of reckless endangerment and harassment. He died in 1980 from a reported heart attack at the bar where he worked at the age of 38.

References 

1964 in Pennsylvania
1964 murders in the United States
March 1964 events in the United States
Deaths by person in Pennsylvania
Deaths by strangulation in the United States
Hazleton, Pennsylvania
Incidents of violence against girls
Rape in the 1960s
Rapes in the United States